3N or 3-N may refer to:

3rd parallel north latitude
Air Urga's IATA code
F6F-3N, a model of Grumman F6F Hellcat
F7F-3N, a model of Grumman F7F Tigercat
P-3N, a model of Lockheed P-3 Orion
8A-3N, a model if Northrop A-17
Routine 3N  Incidents, see Incident (Scientology)

Film
No Nut November, a 2008 South African film

See also
N3 (disambiguation)